This is the discography of American rapper Messy Marv.

Albums

Solo albums
1996: Messy Situationz
1999: Death on a Bitch
2001: Still Explosive
2002: Turf Politics
2004: DisoBAYish
2004: Different Slanguages (as MessCalen)
2004: The Block Files
2004: The Still Explosive Project (as MessCalen)
2005: Bandannas, Tattoos & Tongue Rings
2005: Scrapers, Stunnas & White Tees (as MessCalen)
2006: Hustlan.A.I.R.E.
2006: Gettin' That Guac (as MessCalen)
2006: What You Know bout Me?
2006: What You Know bout Me? Part 2
2008: Cake & Ice Cream
2009: Cake & Ice Cream 2
2009: The Tonite Show With Messy Marv
2011: Kontrabrand
2012: Cake & Ice Cream 3
2013: Wake'n Dey Cook Game Up
2017: Still Marked for death Vol. 1
2017: Still Marked for death Vol. 2
2017: Still Marked for death Vol. 3
2017: Still Marked for death Vol. 4
2017: Still Marked for death Vol. 5

Compilations
2006: Draped Up and Chipped Out
2006: The Features 2K6
2007: Muzik Fo' Tha Taliban
2007: Slangin' at the Corner Store
2007: Filmoe Nation, Vol. 1
2007: Filmoe Nation, Vol. 2
2007: The Free Messy Marv Movement
2007: Draped Up & Chipped Out, Vol. 2
2008: Draped Up and Chipped Out, Vol. 3
2009: Draped Up and Chipped Out, Vol. 4
2009: The Best Of
2010: The Shooting Range Part 1
2010: The Shooting Range Part 2
2010: Millionaire Gangsta
2010: Thizz City
2011: The Shooting Range Part 3
2011: The Shooting Range Part 4
2011: The Shooting Range Part 5
2011: Goon Vitamins Vol. 1
2011: Goon Vitamins Vol. 2
2011: Goon Vitamins Vol. 3
2012: The Definition Of Greed: Up All Night Hustlin Vol. 1
2012: Shots Fired
2012: A Hundred Planes

Collaboration albums
1998: Explosive Mode (with San Quinn)
2002: Turf Thuggin (with I-Rocc)
2003: Bonnie & Clyde (with Marvaless)
2004: The Re-Up (with I-Rocc)
2006: Explosive Mode 2: Back In Business (with San Quinn)
2006: Explosive Mode 3: The Mob Gets Explosive (with San Quinn, Husalah and The Jacka)
2006: 100 Racks (with Yukmouth)
2006: The Infrastructure (with Guce as Bullys wit Fullys)
2007: Da Bidness (with P.S.D. Tha Drivah & Keak Da Sneak)
2007: Messy Slick (with Mitchy Slick)
2007: Guerilla Red (with Prince Bugsy)
2008: The Best Of Bullys Wit Fullys The Movement (with Guce and Killa Tay as Bullys wit Fullys)
2008: Fillmoe Hard Heads (with JT The Bigga Figga & San Quinn)
2009: Blow (with Berner)
2009: Tha 2nd & 3rd Letter (with T-Nutty)
2010: Blow: Blocks and Boat Docks (with Berner)
2010: Jonestown (with Blanco & The Jacka)
2010: Da Bidness Part 2 (with P.S.D. Tha Drivah & Keak Da Sneak)
2011: Atlantic City (with Melo)
2011: Neighborhood Supastar 3 (with Philthy Rich)
2012: AM To The PM (with Young Doe)
2015: Good For Nothing (with Berner)
2015: Rubber Ducks & Gucci Duffles (with DZ) 
2018: Explosive Mode 4 (with San Quinn)
2018: When you a threat you a target ( with Shill Mac)
2018: Chow Time (with Mozzy)

Mixtapes
2003 The Ko-Alition - Click Clack Gang Mixtape, Vol. 1
2006: HollyHood The Mixtape
2006: West Coast Gangsta, Vol. 16
2008: A Hustlas Motivation Vol. 1 (as The Boy Boy Young Mess)
2008: A Hustlas Motivation Vol. 2 (as The Boy Boy Young Mess)
2008: A Hustlas Motivation Vol. 3 (as The Boy Boy Young Mess)
2009: Prices on My Head: Thug Money on Ya Family, Vol. 1 (as The Boy Boy Young Mess)
2009: Prices on My Head: Thug Money on Ya Family, Vol. 2 (as The Boy Boy Young Mess)
2009: Highly Aggressive Vol. 1 (as The Boy Boy Young Mess)
2010: Highly Aggressive Vol. 2 (as The Boy Boy Young Mess)
2010: Nemmo: Paystyle Flow - No Pen Vol. 1 (as The Boy Boy Young Mess)
2010: Nemmo: Paystyle Flow - No Pen Vol. 2 (as The Boy Boy Young Mess)
2010: Skrillionaire
2010: Urban Legend
2011: Kokaine Ballads Frum My S550 (as The Boy Boy Young Mess)
2012: Da New Frank Lukas Dat Neva Wore Da Mink Coat  (as The Boy Boy Young Mess)

Messy Marv Presents

2007 The Click Clack Gangs Gutta Mob - Gutta Or Nuttin
2008 Royal HiniSS - Project Celebrities
2011 Pittsburgh Philthy - Pittbull Vicious
2012 Feva - Pay Da Fee
2018: JocNation - Well Connected (with San Quinn)

References

Hip hop discographies
Discographies of American artists